Soy Así (I am like this) is 23rd studio album recorded by Mexican performer José José, It was released by RCA Ariola in 1987 (see 1987 in music). It was written and produced by Spanish producer Rafael Pérez-Botija. This album became the fourth number-one set on the Billboard Latin Pop Albums by the artist and at the Grammy Awards of 1989 was nominated for Best Latin Pop Performance and for Pop Album of the Year at the 1st Lo Nuestro Music Awards.

Soy Así yielded four successful singles: the title track reached the number-one position in the Billboard Hot Latin Tracks chart, while "Mi Hembra" peaked at number 5, "Salúdamela Mucho" at number 22, and "Vergüenza Me Da Quererte" reached number 8.

Track listing
All the songs written, arranged and produced by Rafael Pérez-Botija.
"Vergüenza Me Da Quererte"
"Ni en un Millón de Años"
"Cobarde"
"Cinco Minutos"
"Salúdamela Mucho"
"Soy Así"
"Si Te Parece Poco"
"Quiero Morir En Tu Piel"
"La Estrella"
"Mi Hembra"

Chart performance

References

1987 albums
José José albums
RCA Records albums
Spanish-language albums